Sugar is an American reality streaming television series that premiered on August 15, 2018, on YouTube Premium. It is based on the 2005 comedy film Wedding Crashers and the music video for American band Maroon 5's 2015 single "Sugar". The series features a different popular music artist or group surprising fans who have given back to their community, which include pop-up performances and appearances. The show was created by Adam Levine and is executive produced by Levine and David Dobkin.

Premise
The inaugural season of Sugar featured eight episodes, which aired weekly on YouTube Premium. The series features a different popular music artist or group each week surprising fans who have given back to their community.

Adam Levine made a public statement upon the announcement of the series.

Production

Development
In October 2015, the series was first announced by NBC, the series it was inspired by the Maroon 5 music video "Sugar". On July 13, 2018, it was announced that YouTube has picked-up the series and had given the production a series order for a first season comprising eight episodes and that the show would premiere on August 15, 2018. Executive producers are include Adam Levine, David Dobkin, Jay Renfroe, David Garfinkle, Megan Wolpert Dobkin, Josh Gummersall, and Todd Yasui. Dobkin directed the first two episodes and Alex Van Wagner directed the series' remaining episodes. Production companies involved with the series are expected to include 222 Productions and Renegade 83. On August 3, 2018, the official trailer for the series was released.

Jordan Feldstein was originally announced and involvement as executive producer in the series. Feldstein who died in 2017, with the series' first episode was dedicated to his memory.

Casting
The series' celebrity guests included Maroon 5, Blake Shelton, Snoop Dogg, Charlie Puth, Kelly Clarkson, A$AP Ferg, Fifth Harmony, and Bad Bunny.

Episodes

Notes

References

External links
 

2010s American drama television series
2018 American television series debuts
2018 American television series endings
2018 web series debuts
2010s American reality television series
Adam Levine
Maroon 5
YouTube Premium original series
Television series by Entertainment One